GHHS may refer to:
Guy's Hill High School in Saint Catherine, Jamaica
 Garfield Heights High School in Garfield Heights, Ohio
 Gig Harbor High School in Gig Harbor, Washington
 Granite Hills High School (Apple Valley, California)
 Granite Hills High School (El Cajon, California)
 Granite Hills High School (Porterville, California)
 Green Hope High School in Cary, North Carolina
 Granada Hills High School, the former name of Granada Hills Charter High School
 Gold Humanism Honor Society, medical honor society